Pleasantville School District may refer to:
 Pleasantville Community School District (Iowa)
 Pleasantville Public Schools (New Jersey)